Edward Drollet (born 7 June 1975) in the Cook Islands is a footballer who plays as a midfielder. He currently plays for Tupapa Maraerenga in the Cook Islands Round Cup and the Cook Islands national football team.

References

1975 births
Living people
Cook Islands international footballers
Association football defenders
Cook Island footballers
1998 OFC Nations Cup players
2000 OFC Nations Cup players